Central Statistical Office may refer to:
Central Statistical Office (Poland)
Central Statistical Office (United Kingdom)
Hungarian Central Statistical Office

Statistical Office of the Republic of Slovenia
The Central Statistical Agency of Ethiopia, which was formerly known as the "Central Statistical Office"

See also
 Central Statistics Office (disambiguation)
 Central Bureau of Statistics (disambiguation)